Artur Marcin Jędrzejczyk (born 4 November 1987) is a Polish professional footballer who plays as a defender for Ekstraklasa club Legia Warsaw.

Club career

Jędrzejczyk joined Legia Warsaw in August 2006 from Igloopol Dębica. He spent two seasons on loan in the lower leagues, then returned to Legia for the 2009–10 season.

On 7 August 2010, he scored a hat-trick against Arsenal in a friendly match. The match ended with a 6–5 win for Arsenal.

On 30 May 2013, Jędrzejczyk signed a three-year contract with FC Krasnodar, extending it by two years in December 2014.

On 30 December 2016, he returned to Legia Warsaw.

International career
On 12 October 2010, he debuted for the Poland national team in a friendly match against Ecuador. The match ended in a 2–2 draw.

Jędrzejczyk has represented Poland at Euro 2016, appearing in all five games as a starting left-back, on their run to the quarter-final. He formed the defense together with his Legia Warsaw teammate, Michal Pazdan.

In June 2018 he was named in Poland's 23-man squad for the 2018 FIFA World Cup in Russia.

Career statistics

Club

International

Scores and results list Poland's goal tally first, score column indicates score after each Jędrzejczyk goal.

Honours
Legia Warsaw
 Ekstraklasa (6): 2012–13, 2015–16, 2016–17, 2017–18, 2019–20, 2020–21
 Polish Cup: 2010–11, 2011–12, 2012–13, 2015–16, 2017–18

References

External links

1987 births
Living people
People from Dębica
Sportspeople from Podkarpackie Voivodeship
Polish footballers
Association football defenders
Poland international footballers
UEFA Euro 2016 players
2018 FIFA World Cup players
2022 FIFA World Cup players
Ekstraklasa players
Russian Premier League players
Igloopol Dębica players
Legia Warsaw players
GKS Jastrzębie players
Ząbkovia Ząbki players
Korona Kielce players
FC Krasnodar players
Polish expatriate footballers
Polish expatriate sportspeople in Russia
Expatriate footballers in Russia